Uma Ramakrishnan is an Indian molecular ecologist and professor at National Centre for Biological Sciences (NCBS), Bangalore. Her research investigates population genetics and evolutionary history of mammals in the Indian subcontinent, including work to save India’s tigers.  In July 2019, she was elected as a fellow to the Indian National Science Academy.

Education
Ramakrishnan did a Bachelor of Science in Physics, Chemistry and Mathematics and a Master's in biotechnology. She subsequently received a PhD from the University of California, San Diego, following which she was a postdoc at Stanford University.

Research and career
Ramakrishnan joined NCBS in 2005 as an assistant professor. Her lab developed methods to conduct population monitoring and landscape/population genetics with tiger fecal samples. Her previous projects include work on contrasting population structure between commensal and wild rodents, and understanding drivers of diversification in montane bird communities in the Western Ghats.Ramakrishnan has worked with the tiger expert and former director of Wildlife Conservation Society- India, K. Ullas Karanth. Together with Karanth, Ramakrishnan's lab used genetic sampling to estimate the tiger population in Bandipur National Park. Her research on the connectivity of tiger populations in Central India was presented in court to stay the widening of NH7 which cuts across the Kanha-Pench corridor.

Publications 

 Merging paleobiology with conservation biology to guide the future of terrestrial ecosystems, Science 
 History of Click-Speaking Populations of Africa Inferred from mtDNA and Y Chromosome Genetic Variation, Molecular Biology and Evolution, 
 Protected areas and biodiversity conservation in India, Biological Conservation, 
 Conservation priorities for endangered Indian tigers through a genomic lens, Scientific Reports
 Rapid multiplex PCR based species identification of wild tigers using non-invasive samples, Conservation Genetics.
 Commensalism facilitates gene flow in mountains: a comparison between two Rattus species 
 Identifying species, sex and individual tigers and leopards in the Malenad-Mysore Tiger Landscape, Western Ghats, India - Mondol, S., Kumar, N.S., Gopalaswamy, A. et al. Conservation Genet Resour (2015) 7: 353. doi:10.1007/s12686-014-0371-9 
 Reassessment of the distribution and threat status of the Western Ghats endemic bird, Nilgiri Pipit Anthus nilghiriensis - V. V. Robin*,†, C. K. Vishnudas* and Uma Ramakrishnan

Awards and honours 
 Ramanujan Fellowship, Department of Science and Technology, Government of India (2010)
Parker/Gentry Award by Field Museum, Chicago
Senior Research Visiting Fellow, Department of Biological Sciences, National University of Singapore (2011)
Outstanding Scientist Award, Department of Atomic Energy (2012)
Fellow, Indian National Science Academy (INSA)

References

Year of birth missing (living people)
Living people
Scientists from Bangalore
Indian women physicists